And the Winner Is... is the second album by the American hip hop musician Chubb Rock, released in 1989. As on Chubb's debut, producer Howie Tee is credited on the album cover.

The album made the top 30 on the Billboard Top R&B Albums. "Ya Bad Chubbs" was a top 20 hit on the Billboard Hot Rap Singles chart, and an early video hit for Yo! MTV Raps. The single peaked at No. 89 on the UK Singles Chart.

Production
The album was produced by Howie Tee. "And the Winner Is...(The Grammys)" is a response to the decision by the National Academy of Recording Arts and Sciences to present the Grammy Award for best rap album before the televised broadcast of the show. Chubb had started composing a version of the track prior to the introduction of the new award category. Barry White duets with Chubb on the title track.

Critical reception

The Orange County Register deemed And the Winner Is... full of "one dimensional but humorous boasts."

AllMusic thought that the album "featured sharp humor with first-rate samples and production, plus insightful commentary on ghetto violence and the ignorance of the NARAS (National Academy of Recording Arts and Sciences)." MusicHound R&B: The Essential Album Guide called it Chubb's best, writing that it contains "deft production work and some insightful social commentaries that are leavened by Chubb's humorous streak."

Track listing

References

Chubb Rock albums
1989 albums
Select Records albums